Maxim Berezin (born January 29, 1991) is a Russian professional ice hockey defenceman who currently plays for HC Neftekhimik Nizhnekamsk of the Kontinental Hockey League (KHL).

Playing career
Berezin started his career in 2007 with the Neftekhimik Nizhnekamsk of the third level Pervaya Liga as a seventeen-year-old, where he scored 13 points in 38 games. He would spend most of his 2008-09 season in the second level Vysshaya Liga playing with Neftyanik Leninogorsk, scoring 6 pts in 32 games.

He would split his next two seasons between Reaktor Nizhnekamsk of the Molodezhnaya Khokkeinaya Liga and Neftekhimik Nizhnekamsk of the Kontinental Hockey League. Berezin would score a career high in points (36) during his 2009–10 stint with Reaktor Nizhnekamsk.

Following tenures with Avangard Omsk and Avtomobilist Yekaterinburg, Berezin returned to original club, Neftekhimik Nizhnekamsk, on a two-year contract beginning in the 2021–22 season on 3 August 2021.

International play
Berezin was most a member of the Russian team that won the gold medal in the 2011 World Junior Ice Hockey Championships. In seven games, he did not score but had three assists and eight penalty minutes.

References

External links
 

1991 births
Living people
Avangard Omsk players
Avtomobilist Yekaterinburg players
HC Neftekhimik Nizhnekamsk players
Russian ice hockey defencemen
Sportspeople from Izhevsk